The MSU Faculty of Mechanics and Mathematics is a faculty of Moscow State University.

History
Although lectures in mathematics had been delivered since Moscow State University was founded in 1755, the mathematical and physical department was founded only in 1804.  The Mathematics and Mechanics Department was founded on 1 May 1933 and comprised mathematics, mechanics and astronomy departments (the latter passed to the Physics Department in 1956). In 1953 the department moved to a new building on the Sparrow Hills and the current division in mathematics and mechanics branches was settled. In 1970, the Department of Computational Mathematics and Cybernetics broke off the department due to the research in computer science.

A 2014 article entitled "Math as a tool of anti-semitism" in The Mathematics Enthusiast discussed antisemitism in the Moscow State University’s Department of Mathematics during the 1970s and 1980s.

Current state
Today the Department comprises 26 chairs (17 in the mathematical and 9 in the mechanics branch) and 14 research laboratories. Around 350 professors, assistant professors and researchers work at the department. Around 2000 students and 450 postgraduates study at the department. The education lasts 5 years (6 years from 2011).

Notable alumni

Notable faculty (past and present)
Algebra – O. U. Schmidt, A. G. Kurosh, Yu. I. Manin
Number theory – B. N. Delaunay, A. I. Khinchin, L. G. Shnirelman, A. O. Gelfond
Topology –  P. S. Alexandrov, A. N. Tychonoff, L. S. Pontryagin, Lev Tumarkin
Real analysis – D. E. Menshov, A. I. Khinchin, N. K. Bari, A. N. Kolmogorov, S. B. Stechkin
Complex analysis – I. I. Privalov, M. A. Lavrentiev, A. O. Gelfond, M. V. Keldysh
Ordinary differential equations – V. V. Stepanov, V. V. Nemitski, V. I. Arnold, N. N. Nekhoroshev
Partial differential equations – I. G. Petrovsky, S. L. Sobolev, E. M. Landis
Mathematical logic and Theory of algorithms – A. A. Markov (Jr.), A. N. Kolmogorov, V. A. Melnikov, V. A. Uspensky, A. L.Semenov
Calculus of variations – L. A. Lusternik
Functional analysis – A. N. Kolmogorov, I. M. Gelfand
Probability theory – A. I. Khinchin, A. N. Kolmogorov, Ya. G. Sinai, A. N. Shiryaev
Differential geometry – V. F. Kagan, A. T. Fomenko, N. V. Efimov
Discrete mathematics – O. B. Lupanov
Theoretical Mechanics and Mechatronics – D. E. Okhotsimsky, V. V. Rumyantsev
Aero- and hydrodynamics – L. I. Sedov
Wave theory – A. I. Nekrasov

References

External links
 Official website of the department (in Russian)

Moscow State University
Education in Moscow
Schools of mathematics